The 1931–32 season was the 57th season of competitive football in England.

With a full programme of New Year fixtures across all four divisions, The Times highlighted in particular Aston Villa's clash with high-flying Newcastle United. Villa had recently beaten Newcastle 3-0. Sheffield United were noted as a young team showing splendid form, while Blackburn Rovers were improving after a disastrous start. The Highlight of the Second Division was Bury v Plymouth Argyle.

Events
 7 November 1931: William Richardson 'Ginger' Richardson scored four goals in five minutes for West Bromwich Albion against West Ham United at Upton Park, a record that is still in the Guinness Book of Records.
 19 March 1932: Stanley Matthews, 17-year-old winger, makes his debut for Stoke City in a 2-1 league win over Bury at Gigg Lane.

Honours

Notes = Number in parentheses is the times that club has won that honour. * indicates new record for competition

Football League

First Division

Second Division

Third Division North

Third Division South

Top goalscorers

First Division
Dixie Dean (Everton) – 44 goals

Second Division
Cyril Pearce (Swansea Town) – 35 goals

Third Division North
Alan Hall (Lincoln City) – 42 goals

Third Division South
Clarrie Bourton (Coventry City) – 49 goals

References